The 2014–15 FC Girondins de Bordeaux season was the 134th professional season of the club since its creation in 1881. During the campaign, the club competed in Ligue 1, the top level of French football, along with the Coupe de France and Coupe de la Ligue.

Players

First team squad
As of 30 May 2015

French teams are limited to four players without EU citizenship. Hence, the squad list includes only the principal nationality of each player; several non-European players on the squad have dual citizenship with an EU country. Also, players from the ACP countries—countries in Africa, the Caribbean, and the Pacific that are signatories to the Cotonou Agreement—are not counted against non-EU quotas due to the Kolpak ruling.

Transfers

Transfers in

Loans in

Transfers out

Loans out

Pre-season and friendlies

Competitions

Ligue 1

League table

Results summary

Results by round

Matches

Coupe de France

Coupe de la Ligue

Statistics

Appearances and goals

|-
! colspan=12 style=background:#dcdcdc; text-align:center| Goalkeepers

|-
! colspan=12 style=background:#dcdcdc; text-align:center| Defenders

|-
! colspan=12 style=background:#dcdcdc; text-align:center| Midfielders

|-
! colspan=12 style=background:#dcdcdc; text-align:center| Forwards

|-
! colspan=12 style="background:#dcdcdc; text-align:center"| Players transferred out during the season

Goal scorers
Last updated 19 October 2015

References

FC Girondins de Bordeaux seasons
Bordeaux